Earl St Vincent (or Earl of St Vincent) was launched in 1798 at Gatcombe, on the Severn. She initially traded between Bristol and Jamaica. She then made one voyage as an "extra ship", i.e., under voyage charter, for the British East India Company (EIC). On her return she again traded with the West Indies until she was captured in 1806.

Career
Earl St Vincent entered Lloyd's Register in 1798 with P. Wade, master and owner, and trade Bristol—Jamaica. She was designed as a fast sailing packet vessel. 

Peter Wade acquired a letter of marque. In September 1799 Wade advertised her as sailing from Bristol to Jamaica with himself as master, but then in December advertised her for sale. In January 1800 he advertised her as sailing to Madeira and Jamaica with Robert Williams, master. She then apparently sailed to the West Indies and back to London.

In 1800 the EIC chartered Earl St Vincent for a voyage to India and back. Messrs Princip & Saunders had tendered her to the EIC to bring back rice from Bengal. She was one of 28 vessels that sailed on that mission between December 1800 and February 1801. 

 

Captain Richard Williams sailed from Spithead on 30 December 1800, bound for Bengal. He arrived at Calcutta on 24 May 1801. Homeward bound, she was at Saugor on 8 August, and arrived at the Downs on 26 January 1802.

In 1802 she again sailed to the West Indies and back. In January 1803 Richard Acraman advertised her for sale. Her new owner, R.H. Major, then changed her registry to London as she leaves the Bristol records. Major then sailed between London and the West Indies. He may have sold Earl St Vincent to Hopper and Co., before E. Major & Co. purchased her.

The two sources for the table below (Lloyd's Register and the Register of Shipping) agree in broad outline, but there are discrepancies. The registers published at different times, and are only as accurate as the information owners cared to provide.

Fate
The Morning Chronicle reported that "The Earl St. Vincent, Robley, from Shields to Jamaica, is taken and carried into Rochelle." Both the Register of Shipping (1806) and Lloyd's Register (1807) have the notation "captured" by her name.

Notes

Citations

References
 
 
 
 

1798 ships
Age of Sail merchant ships
Merchant ships of the United Kingdom
Ships of the British East India Company
Captured ships